The White House is the official residence of the president of the United States of America.

White House may also refer to the Executive Office of the President of the United States or any of the following:

Buildings

Channel Islands
 White House (Herm), a hotel

Kyrgyzstan
White House (Bishkek), a presidential building of the Kyrgyz Republic in Bishkek

Netherlands
Witte Huis, a skyscraper in Rotterdam whose name means "White House"

Russia
 White House, Kyshtym, a townhouse in Kyshtym
 White House (Moscow), a government building in Moscow
 White House (Orenburg), a government building in Orenburg

Switzerland 
 The Blue and The White House, two town mansions in Basel

United Kingdom
Ty Gwyn ar Daf ("White House on the Taf"), where a parliament codified Welsh law in the 10th century
The White House, Aston Munslow, in Shropshire
The White House (Poulton-le-Fylde), a Grade II listed building
White House, County Down, a ruined 17th-century dwelling on the Ards Peninsula, Northern Ireland
 The White House, the manor house at Gilwell Park, headquarters of The Scout Association

United States
 First White House of the Confederacy, Montgomery, Alabama
 White House (Casa Grande, Arizona)
 White House (Helena, Arkansas)
 Little White House, Warm Springs, Georgia
 White House (Christianburg, Kentucky)
 The White House (Hartwick, New York)
 White House (Syracuse, New York)
 White House (Huntsville, North Carolina)
 White House of the Chickasaws, Emet, Oklahoma
 White House (Rock Hill, South Carolina)
 White House (Bastrop, Texas)
 White House (Brentsville, Virginia)
 The White House (Luray, Virginia)
 White House of the Confederacy, Richmond, Virginia, where Jefferson Davis lived
 White House (plantation), near White House, Virginia, home of Martha Custis prior to her marriage to George Washington

Entertainment
 White House (film), a 2010 Philippine film
 "White House", a song by The American Analog Set from their 1997 album From Our Living Room to Yours
 The White House (album), a 1995 album by The Dead C

Places
 White House, Jamaica
 White House, New Jersey
 White House, Tennessee
 White House, Virginia
 White House, Page County, Virginia

Other
 The White House (department store), San Francisco, California

See also

Whitehouse (disambiguation)
White Houses (disambiguation)
White House Farm (disambiguation)
White Hall (disambiguation)
Casablanca (disambiguation) (White House in Spanish and Italian)
Maison Blanche (disambiguation)